Keith Alexander Nugent FAA (born 28 June 1959) is an Australian physicist. He is the Deputy Vice-Chancellor (Research and Innovation) of the Australian National University (ANU) in Canberra.

He was previously Deputy Vice-Chancellor and Vice-President (Research) at La Trobe University, Victoria, and a Laureate Professor of Physics at the University of Melbourne, specialising in X-ray optics and optical physics.

He received a first-class honours degree from the University of Adelaide and his PhD from the ANU. Nugent is a Fellow of the Australian Academy of Science (FAA), and is known for his research in X-ray optics, X-ray free electron laser science, novel approaches to microscopy and X-ray phase contrast imaging.

Early life and education 

Nugent was born in Bath, England, where his father was a chocolate chemist for Fry & Sons. The family, including Nugent’s mother and his two brothers, moved to Australia when he was 11, when his father took up a role at Red Tulip (since taken over by Cadbury) in Melbourne. The family moved again to country NSW and Nugent completed his schooling at Batlow Central School.

When he was in year 11, Nugent knew he wanted to further pursue mathematics and physics, and, since it was not available at Batlow Central School, taught himself the highest level maths so he could go on to study physics at university.

He did a BSc in Physics and Theoretical Physics at ANU, Honours in Physics at University of Adelaide, then returned to the ANU to do a PhD in Laser Physics.

Research and career 

Nugent was appointed Professor at the University of Melbourne when he was 34, was elected to the Australian Academy of Science at 41 and was twice honoured as an Australian Research Council (ARC) Federation Fellow (2001 and 2006).

In 1989, Nugent collaborated with physicist Stephen W. Wilkins to develop a form of X-ray optics known as lobster-eye optics. Initially unknown to Wilkins and Nugent, the lobster-eye X-ray optics principle was first proposed for X-rays in the 1970s by Roger Angel. Nugent and Wilkins' key contribution was to open up an approach to manufacturing these devices using microchannel plate technology. The lobster-eye approach opened the way for X-ray telescopes with a 360 degree view of the sky. "The reason it's got such a high profile is that other X-ray telescopes see a tiny, tiny part of the sky. Although normal telescopes see a small part of the sky, X-ray telescopes see an even smaller part. The beauty (of the new telescope) is that it actually expands that field of view hundreds of times," Nugent said.

A lobster-eye X-ray satellite was successfully launched on 25 July 2020 from the Taiyuan Satellite Launch Center. The lobster-eye X-ray satellite will be the world's first in-orbit space exploration satellite equipped with such imaging technology.

Nugent became interested in how to measure optical phase without using interferometry. This has led to new approaches to X-ray radiography, electron and optical microscopy. He was the founding researcher of microscopy company IATIA, created to commercialise the work of himself and his two former PhD students, David Paganin and Anton Barty, in quantitative phase imaging (QPI). IATIA’s QPI technology was able to extract phase and wavefront information from light and other wave-like radiations using conventional imaging technology, such as standard digital cameras, without the need for special optical components. From 2005, Nugent was a Member of the Board of Directors and Chair of IATIA’s Audit Committee. The company traded for 10 years but fell foul of the global financial crisis in 2010. IATIA was awarded the 2006 Australian Technology Showcase Patrons Award.

With a focus on supporting young Australians in science, Nugent and his wife Dr Eroia Barone-Nugent started the Growing Tall Poppies Program (GTP) in 2008. The purpose of the student-scientist partnership program is to highlight the role of physics in solving real-world issues, and to help students become “tall poppies” in science. Nugent was a co-recipient, with Dr Eroia Barone-Nugent, of the 2009 Victorian State Impact Grant, Schools First Award.

Nugent was appointed part-time director of the Australian Synchrotron from 2011-12. He had previously served as a member of its national scientific advisory board and its board of directors.

From 2005-2012, Nugent was director of the ARC Centre of Excellence for Coherent X-ray Science, based at the University of Melbourne, where he drove the development of coherent X-ray diffraction methods for imaging biological structures using X-ray free-electron lasers.

He was deputy vice-chancellor and vice-president (research) at La Trobe University from January 2013 to December 2018.

Nugent has been a member of the ARC Expert Advisory Committee for Physics, Chemistry and Geosciences, and the international scientific advisory board of Elettra Sincotrone Trieste, the National Synchrotron Radiation Research Centre in Taiwan, and the European X-ray Free Electron Laser based in Hamburg. He was a chief investigator for the ARC Centre for Advanced Molecular Imaging.

He is also a board member at National Computational Infrastructure, the Advisory Committee on Policy Matters, Australian Academy of Science and the National Centre for Indigenous Genomics.

ANU deputy vice-chancellor (research and innovation) 

Nugent was appointed deputy vice-chancellor (research and innovation) of the Australian National University in 2019. ANU provost, Professor Mike Calford, said, "We sought to fill this critical role with a person who could continue to build the profile of ANU as a world-leading institution for research and development and one who understands the complex systems that support successful research.

"Professor Nugent has an excellent standing as an individual researcher who is capable of representing ANU at the highest level on the world stage.”

Commercial connections 
Nugent is currently the non-executive director of Significant Early Venture Capital and WearOptimo. He is also the alternate director for VC at ANU Connect Ventures, and director at ANU Enterprise.

Personal life 

Nugent met his wife Dr Eroia Barone-Nugent at the ANU in 1981. The couple have three grown-up children: two sons who live in the USA, and one daughter who lives in Australia.

Awards and honours 
 2016 Lloyd Rees Lecture, Australian Academy of Science.
 2011 Elected Fellow of the American Physical Society.
 2009 Victorian State Impact Grant, Schools First Award, with Dr Eroia Barone-Nugent, for the Growing Tall Poppies program.
 2004 Victoria Prize for pioneering work with quantitative phase imaging.
 2003 Centenary Medal by the Federal Government for outstanding contributions to science.
 2002 R&D 100 Award for the development of quantitative phase microscopy.
 2000 Elected a Fellow of the Australian Academy of Science in 2000.
 1997 The Walter Boas Medal (1997) of the Australian Institute of Physics, shared with Dr Stephen W. Wilkins.
 1992 The Edgeworth David Medal of the Royal Society of New South Wales, shared with Peter James Goadsby.
 1989 Pawsey Medal of the Australian Academy of Science.
 1988 R&D 100 Award for the development of the penumbral neutron imaging camera.

References

External links 

Australian National University Deputy Vice-Chancellor (Research and Innovation) Professor Keith Nugent
University of Melbourne page on Professor Keith Nugent
2004 Victoria Prize 
2004 Victoria Prize media release

1959 births
Living people
Australian physicists
Fellows of the Australian Academy of Science
University of Adelaide alumni
Australian National University alumni
Academic staff of the University of Melbourne
Fellows of the American Physical Society